Jean Réville (6 November 1854 – 6 May 1908) was a French Protestant theologian born in Rotterdam, Netherlands. He was the son of theologian Albert Réville (1826–1906).

He studied theology at Geneva, Berlin and Heidelberg, obtaining his licentiate in theology in Paris (1880). He subsequently became a pastor in Sainte-Suzanne, Doubs, and in 1886 received his doctorate in theology at the Protestant Faculty of Theology in Paris. In 1894 he was appointed professor of patristics to the theological faculty at the Sorbonne.

Réville was a prominent figure in French Liberal Protestantism. From 1884 until his death, he was editor of the Revue de l'Histoire des Religions.

Works
Among his better known publications are the following:
1881: La Doctrine du logos dans le quatrième évangile et dans les œuvres de Philon
1886: La Religion à Rome sous les Sévères
1894: Les Origines de l'Épiscopat
1896: Paroles d'un Libre-Croyant
1900: Le quatrième Évangile. Son origine et sa valeur historique
1903: Le Protestantisme libéral, ses origines, sa nature, sa mission, reprint Théolib Paris 2011
1906: Le Prophétisme hébreu
1907: Leçon d'ouverture du cours d'Histoire des Religions professé au Collège de France
1908: Les origines de l'Eucharistie, Messe, Sainte-Cène
1909: Les phases successives de l'histoire des religions

References 
 1911 Encyclopædia Britannica A Dictionary of Arts, Sciences, etc.
  English translation

1854 births
1908 deaths
Academic staff of the University of Paris
Academic staff of the Collège de France
Academic staff of the École pratique des hautes études
Writers from Rotterdam
French Protestant theologians
19th-century Protestant theologians
19th-century French theologians
French historians of religion
French Calvinist and Reformed theologians
French Calvinist and Reformed ministers
Academic staff of the Protestant Faculty of Theology in Paris